Piano Sonata No. 5 may refer to: 
Piano Sonata No. 5 (Beethoven)
Piano Sonata No. 5 (Mozart)
Piano Sonata No. 5 (Prokofiev)
Piano Sonata No. 5 (Scriabin)